Misery is a broadway play directed by Will Frears, from a book by William Goldman. It is based on the 1987 novel of the same name by Stephen King, which was adapted into a 1990 film, written by Goldman.

Roles and principal casts

Cast

Productions
All three versions of the play were written by William Goldman (who also wrote the 1990 film's screenplay), while Will Frears directed the U.S. versions and Robert Gliński directed the 2017 Polish adaptation.

Bucks County Playhouse (2012)
The play, in association with Castle Rock Entertainment, premiered at the Bucks County Playhouse on November 24, 2012, for 11 performances, and closed on December 8, 2012. The play starred Daniel Gerroll as Paul Sheldon, Johanna Day as Annie Wilkes, and James DeMarse as Sheriff Buster.

Broadhurst Theatre (2015–16)
A new version of the production officially opened at the Broadhurst Theatre on October 22, 2015 and closed on February 16, 2016. This version starred Bruce Willis as Sheldon, Laurie Metcalf as Wilkes, and Leon Addison Brown as Buster. The show ran for 102 performances, grossing $12,518,415 in ticket sales.

Kwadrat Theatre (2017)
The play was re-adapted in the Polish language, starring Ewa Wencel as Wilkes, Piotr Polk as Sheldon, and Marcin Pietowski as Buster, and premiered at the Kwadrat Theatre in Warsaw on January 9, 2017.

Reception
For Metcalf's performance as Wilkes, she was nominated for a Tony Award for Best Actress in a Play. Willis' performance was generally panned by critics, who called it "vacant" and "inert". Some new sources have criticized Willis for using an ear piece on the play.

References

External links
 
 

2012 musicals
Broadway musicals
Musicals based on films
Musicals based on novels
Plays by William Goldman
Stage shows based on works by Stephen King
Warner Bros. Theatrical